Pudivere may refer to several places in Estonia:

Pudivere, Jõgeva County, village in Põltsamaa Parish, Jõgeva County
Pudivere, Lääne-Viru County, village in Väike-Maarja Parish, Lääne-Viru County